The Hollywood Cemetery is the oldest cemetery in Hot Springs, Arkansas.  The cemetery was established sometime prior to the American Civil War, with its oldest marked grave dating to 1856.  It is located southeast of downtown Hot Springs, and is bounded by Hollywood Avenue, Mote Street, and Shady Grove Road.  Its Confederate Section, located in the northeastern part of the cemetery, commemorates the city's Civil War Confederate Army soldiers, and contains 34 marked burials.  At the center of that area is an  granite monument in which is a marble marker inscribed "OUR CONFEDERATE DEAD".  The Confederate section of the cemetery was listed on the National Register of Historic Places in 1996.

The cemetery has two notable burials – Indian Wars Medal of Honor recipient Christian Steiner (1843–1880) and US Congressman Lewis E. Sawyer (1867–1923).

See also
 National Register of Historic Places listings in Garland County, Arkansas

References

External links
 

Cemeteries on the National Register of Historic Places in Arkansas
Buildings and structures completed in 1856
Buildings and structures in Garland County, Arkansas
National Register of Historic Places in Hot Springs, Arkansas
Cemeteries established in the 1850s